The Embassy of the United States to the Republic of Indonesia is located in Jakarta just south of the Monas and the Presidential Palace at Jalan Medan Merdeka Selatan.

The original building was designed by the Czech architect Antonin Raymond and Ladislav Rado. They began work on the design in 1953. The preliminary design for the embassy was criticized by Sukarno. He felt that the small two-story design they produced suggested that the post was unimportant to the United States. He wished to have a larger and more prominent building constructed. Sukarno, however, ultimately accepted the design after small alterations were made, in part due to pressure directed at him by the U.S. State Department.

The US Ambassador, Scot Marciel, announced the construction of a new embassy in July, 2012.  The new embassy will include a 10-story Chancery building, parking garage, support annex, utility building, consular waiting area, three entrance facilities and restoration of a historic building which the Republic of Indonesia delegation occupied during negotiations with the Dutch in 1949. The Bureau of Overseas Buildings Operations announced the award of a $302 million design/build contract to B.L. Harbert International of Birmingham, Alabama in November, 2012, and named Davis Brody Bond Architects and Planners of New York, New York as the concept design architect and Page Southerland Page of Arlington, Virginia as the architect of record.

Protests against the foreign policy of the United States have been held at the embassy in response to U.S. policy on West Papua, Communism, and the War in Afghanistan.

See also
 United States Ambassador to Indonesia
 Consulate General of the United States, Surabaya
 Indonesia–United States relations
 List of diplomatic missions of the United States

References

Bibliography

External links
Embassy of the United States in Jakarta website

Jakarta
United States
Indonesia–United States relations